Houmont Park is an Unincorporated community in east central Harris County, Texas, United States.

The subdivision developed during the 1950s and the 1960s, as Greater Houston expanded in size.

Education
Sheldon Independent School District operates schools serving the community.

An elementary school, C.E. King Middle School, C.E. King High School, and the district's Crenshaw Memorial Stadium are within  of the Houmont Park townsite.

Residents are zoned to Cravens Early Childhood Academy, Royalwood Elementary School, King Middle School, and King High School.

References

External links

Unincorporated communities in Harris County, Texas
Unincorporated communities in Texas